Yrjö Kaarle Kilpeläinen (3 October 1907, Leppävirta – 30 January 1955) was a Finnish journalist, educationist and politician. He was a Member of the Parliament of Finland from 1945 until his death in 1955, representing the Social Democratic Party of Finland (SDP). He belonged to the right wing of the party.

References

1907 births
1955 deaths
People from Leppävirta
People from Kuopio Province (Grand Duchy of Finland)
Social Democratic Party of Finland politicians
Members of the Parliament of Finland (1945–48)
Members of the Parliament of Finland (1948–51)
Members of the Parliament of Finland (1951–54)
Members of the Parliament of Finland (1954–58)
University of Helsinki alumni
Finnish people of World War II